Michael David Johnson (born February 7, 1987) is a former American football defensive end. He was drafted by the Cincinnati Bengals in the third round of the 2009 NFL Draft and has also played for the Tampa Bay Buccaneers. He played college football at Georgia Tech.

Early years 
Johnson played high school football at Dallas County High School in Plantersville, Alabama. Playing tight end, Johnson was the team captain and MVP for coach Richard Bush. As a junior, he had 25 receptions for 300 yards and three touchdowns. He caught 42 passes for 650 yards and six touchdowns as a senior while making 92 tackles and 14 sacks on defense. Johnson was also an outstanding basketball player, who averaged 16 points and 10 rebounds as a junior. Johnson Graduated valedictorian of his class.

College career 
As a senior at Georgia Tech, Johnson, in 2008, ended the regular season with Recorded 46 tackles (28 solos) as he led the team and finished third in the conference with nine sacks and 17.5 stops for losses and two forced fumbles. He was voted as an AFCA coaches First-team All-American with the likes of Brian Orakpo and Terrence Cody. He also garnered first-team All-ACC honors as well as numerous other accolades.

In 2007, Johnson played in 13 games and started one. He had 21 tackle (11 solo) and six went for losses. He had four sacks and forced three fumbles and recovered one. He also blocked two kicks.  The previous season, 2006, he played in and started all 12 games and had 34 tackles (25 solo) and six were for a loss. He recorded five sacks and forced three fumbles and broke up two passes. In 2005, as a true freshman, he played in 11 games and had 5 solo tackles and one assisted for a total of six tackles, one going for a loss. He also recorded one sack and forced one fumble.

On May 2, 2015, after six seasons in the NFL, Johnson officially earned his degree from Georgia Tech.

Professional career

Cincinnati Bengals
Johnson was not selected in the first round of the 2009 NFL Draft where many analysts predicted he would go, instead falling into the third round and being picked 70th overall by the Bengals. During an interview, Johnson was mentioned by head coach Marvin Lewis as maybe being "one of the best pass rushers he has ever worked with."  Before the 2010 season, the Bengals announced that Johnson would be moved to outside linebacker.

In 2012, Johnson accumulated 52 tackles, 35 solo, and 11.5 sacks. He also had one interception and one force fumble.

The Bengals placed their non-exclusive franchise tag on Johnson on March 1, 2013.

Tampa Bay Buccaneers
Johnson signed a five-year, $43.98 million contract with the Tampa Bay Buccaneers on March 11, 2014. Johnson's debut season for the Buccaneers was marred with injuries consistently the entire  year. In the 2014 season, he recorded 27 combined tackles, 4.0 quarterback sacks, and two forced fumbles.

On March 11, 2015, exactly one year to the day he signed with the Buccaneers, Johnson was released. The move saved $2 million in cap space despite the loss of $7 million in guaranteed money that the team still had to pay.

Cincinnati Bengals (second stint)
On March 15, 2015, Johnson re-joined his former team, signing a four-year, $24 million contract with the Cincinnati Bengals.

In Week 5 of the 2018 season, Johnson recorded a 22-yard pick-six in the 27–17 victory over the Miami Dolphins.

References

External links
Cincinnati Bengals bio
Georgia Tech Yellow Jackets bio

1987 births
Living people
Sportspeople from Selma, Alabama
Players of American football from Alabama
American football defensive ends
Georgia Tech Yellow Jackets football players
Cincinnati Bengals players
Tampa Bay Buccaneers players